The Edberg–Lendl rivalry was a tennis rivalry between Stefan Edberg and Ivan Lendl. They competed 27 times during their careers, between 1984 and 1992, and Edberg leads the head-to-head 14–13. In an interview with the ATP in 2008, Edberg reflected on his classic rivalries.

Head-to-head

Singles (27)
Edberg 14 – Lendl 13

Head-to-head breakdown
 All matches: (27)  Edberg 14–13
 All finals: Lendl 4–3
 Grand Slam matches: Edberg 5–4
 Grand Slam finals: Lendl 1–0
 Non-Grand Slam finals: Tied 3–3
 Tennis Masters Cup matches: Tied 2–2
 Five-set matches: Edberg 3–2

References

External links
 ATP Edberg vs Lendl head-to-head

Tennis rivalries